The culture of Scotland refers to the patterns of human activity and symbolism associated with Scotland and the Scottish people. The Scottish flag is blue with a white saltire, and represents the cross of Saint Andrew.

Scots law

Scotland retains Scots Law, its own unique legal system, based on Roman law, which combines features of both civil law and common law. The terms of union with England specified the retention of separate systems. The barristers are called advocates, and the judges of the high court for civil cases are also the judges for the high court for criminal cases. Scots Law differs from England's common law system. 
Formerly, there were several regional law systems in Scotland, one of which was Udal Law (also called allodail or odal law) in Shetland and Orkney. This was a direct descendant of Old Norse Law, but was abolished in 1611. Despite this, Scottish courts have acknowledged the supremacy of udal law in some property cases as recently as the 1990s. Various systems based on common Celtic Law also survived in the Highlands until the 1800s.

Banking and currency

Banking in Scotland also features unique characteristics. Although the Bank of England remains the central bank for the UK Government, three Scottish corporate banks still issue their own banknotes: the Bank of Scotland, the Royal Bank of Scotland and the Clydesdale Bank.

Sports

Scotland competes in sporting events such as the FIFA World Cup. Scotland does not compete in the Olympic Games independently however, and in athletics, Scotland has competed for the Celtic Cup, against teams from Wales and Ireland, since the inaugural event in 2006.

Scotland is the "Home of Golf", and is well known for its courses. As well as its world-famous Highland Games (athletic competitions), it is also the home of curling, and shinty, a stick game similar to Ireland's hurling. 
Scotland has 4 professional ice hockey teams that compete in the Elite Ice Hockey League. Scottish cricket is a minority game.

Literature

The earliest extant literature written in what is now Scotland, was composed in Brythonic speech in the sixth century and has survived as part of Welsh literature. In the following centuries there was literature in Latin, under the influence of the Catholic Church, and in Old English, brought by Anglian settlers. As the state of Alba developed into the kingdom of Scotland from the eighth century, there was a flourishing literary elite who regularly produced texts in both Gaelic and Latin, sharing a common literary culture with Ireland and elsewhere. After the Davidian Revolution of the thirteenth century a flourishing French language culture predominated, while Norse literature was produced from areas of Scandinavian settlement. The first surviving major text in Early Scots literature is the fourteenth-century poet John Barbour's epic Brus, which was followed by a series of vernacular versions of medieval romances. These were joined in the fifteenth century by Scots prose works.

In the early modern era royal patronage supported poetry, prose and drama. James V's court saw works such as Sir David Lindsay of the Mount's The Thrie Estaitis. In the late sixteenth century James VI became patron and member of a circle of Scottish court poets and musicians known as the Castalian Band. When he acceded to the English throne in 1603 many followed him to the new court, but without a centre of royal patronage the tradition of Scots poetry subsided. It was revived after union with England in 1707 by figures including Allan Ramsay, Robert Fergusson and James Macpherson. The latter's Ossian Cycle made him the first Scottish poet to gain an international reputation. He helped inspire Robert Burns, considered by many to be the national poet, and Walter Scott, whose Waverley Novels did much to define Scottish identity in the 19th century. Towards the end of the Victorian era a number of Scottish-born authors achieved international reputations, including Robert Louis Stevenson, Arthur Conan Doyle, J. M. Barrie and George MacDonald.

In the 20th century there was a surge of activity in Scottish literature, known as the Scottish Renaissance. The leading figure, Hugh MacDiarmid, attempted to revive the Scots language as a medium for serious literature. Members of the movement were followed by a new generation of post-war poets including Edwin Morgan, who would be appointed the first Scots Makar by the inaugural Scottish government in 2004. From the 1980s Scottish literature enjoyed another major revival, particularly associated with writers including James Kelman and Irvine Welsh. Scottish poets who emerged in the same period included Carol Ann Duffy, who was named as the first Scot to be UK Poet Laureate in May 2009.

Art

The earliest examples of art from what is now Scotland are highly decorated carved stone balls from the Neolithic period. From the Bronze Age there are examples of carvings, including the first representations of objects, and cup and ring marks. From the Iron Age there are more extensive examples of patterned objects and gold work. From the early Middle Ages there are elaborately carved Pictish stones and impressive metalwork. The development of a common style of Insular art across Great Britain and Ireland influenced elaborate jewellery and illuminated manuscripts like the Book of Kells. Only isolated examples survive of native artwork from the late Middle Ages and of works created or strongly influenced by artists of Flemish origin. The influence of the Renaissance can be seen in stone carving and painting from the fifteenth century. In the sixteenth century the crown began to employ Flemish court painters who have left a portrait record of royalty. The Reformation removed a major source of patronage for art, limited the level of public display, but may have helped in the growth of secular domestic forms, particularly elaborate painting of roofs and walls. In the seventeenth century there were the first significant native artists for whom names are extant, with figures like George Jamesone and John Michael Wright, but the loss of the court as a result of the Union of Crowns in 1603 removed another major source of patronage.

In the eighteenth century Scotland began to produce artists that were significant internationally, all influenced by neoclassicism, such as Allan Ramsay, Gavin Hamilton, the brothers John and Alexander Runciman, Jacob More and David Allan. Towards the end of the century Romanticism began to affect artistic production, and can be seen in the portraits of artists such as Henry Raeburn. It also contributed to a tradition of Scottish landscape painting that focused on the Highlands, formulated by figures including Alexander Nasmyth. The Royal Scottish Academy of Art was created in 1826, and major portrait painters of this period included Andrew Geddes and David Wilkie. William Dyce emerged as one of the most significant figures in art education in the United Kingdom. The beginnings of a Celtic Revival can be seen in the late nineteenth century and the art scene was dominated by the work of the Glasgow Boys and the Four, led Charles Rennie Mackintosh, who gained an international reputation for their combination of Celtic revival, Art and Crafts and Art Nouveau. The early twentieth century was dominated by the Scottish Colourists and the Edinburgh School. They have been described as the first Scottish modern artists and were the major mechanism by which post-impressionism reached Scotland. There was a growing interest in forms of Modernism, with William Johnstone helping to develop the concept of a Scottish Renaissance.  In the post-war period, major artists, including John Bellany and Alexander Moffat, pursued a strand of "Scottish realism". Moffat's influence can be seen in the work of the "new Glasgow Boys" from the late twentieth century. In the twenty-first century Scotland has continued to produce successful and influential such as Douglas Gordon, David Mach, Susan Philipsz and Richard Wright.

Scotland possess significant collections of art, such as the National Gallery of Scotland and National Museum of Scotland in Edinburgh and the Burrell Collection and Kelvingrove Art Gallery and Museum in Glasgow. Significant schools of art include the Edinburgh College of Art and the Glasgow School of Art. The major funding body with responsibility for the arts in Scotland is Creative Scotland. Support is also given by local councils and independent foundations.

Music

Scotland is internationally known for its traditional music, which remained vibrant throughout the 20th century and into the 21st, when many traditional forms worldwide lost popularity to pop music. In spite of emigration and a well-developed connection to music imported from the rest of Europe and the United States, the music of Scotland has kept many of its traditional aspects; indeed, it has itself influenced many forms of music.

Many outsiders associate Scottish folk music almost entirely with the Great Highland Bagpipe, which has long played an important part in Scottish music. Although this particular form of bagpipe developed exclusively in Scotland, it is not the only Scottish bagpipe. The earliest mention of bagpipes in Scotland dates to the 15th century although they are believed to have been introduced to Britain by the Roman armies. The pìob mhór, or Great Highland Bagpipe, was originally associated with both hereditary piping families and professional pipers to various clan chiefs; later, pipes were adopted for use in other venues, including military marching. Piping clans included the Clan Henderson, MacArthurs, MacDonalds, McKays and, especially, the MacCrimmon, who were hereditary pipers to the Clan MacLeod.

Media

Scotland's media are partly separate from the rest of the UK. For example, Scotland has several national newspapers, such as the Daily Record (Scotland's leading tabloid), the broadsheet The Herald, based in Glasgow, and The Scotsman in Edinburgh. Sunday newspapers include the tabloid Sunday Mail (published by Daily Record parent company Trinity Mirror) and the Sunday Post, while the Sunday Herald and Scotland on Sunday have associations with The Herald and The Scotsman respectively.

Regional dailies include The Courier and Advertiser in Dundee and the east, and The Press and Journal serving Aberdeen and the north. 
                                               
Scotland has its own BBC services which include the national radio stations, BBC Radio Scotland and Scottish Gaelic language service BBC Radio nan Gaidheal. There are also a number of BBC and independent local radio stations throughout the country. In addition to radio, BBC Scotland also runs three national television stations: the Scottish variant of BBC One, the BBC Scotland channel and Gaelic-language TV channel BBC Alba. Much of the output of BBC Scotland Television, such as news and current affairs programmes, and the Glasgow-based soap opera, River City, are intended for broadcast within Scotland, while others, such as drama and comedy programmes, aim at audiences throughout the UK and further afield.

Two ITV stations, STV and ITV, also broadcast in Scotland. Most of the independent television output is the same as that transmitted in England, Wales and Northern Ireland, with the exception of news and current affairs, sport, comedy, cultural and Scottish Gaelic-language programming.

As one of the Celtic nations, Scotland is represented at the Celtic Media Festival (formerly known as the Celtic International Film Festival). Scottish entrants have won many awards since the festival began in 1980. Scottish sponsors and partners of the event include Highlands and Islands Enterprise, BBC Scotland, MG Alba, Scottish Screen, STV and Bòrd na Gàidhlig.

Food and drink

Although the deep-fried Mars bar is jokingly said to exemplify the modern Scottish diet, Scottish cuisine offers traditional dishes such as fish and chips, haggis, the Arbroath smokie, salmon, venison, cranachan, the bannock, stovies, Scotch broth, tattie scone and shortbread.

Scotland is also known for its Scotch whisky distilleries, as well as for Scottish beer.

The soft drink Irn-Bru is cited by its manufacturer A.G. Barr as Scotland's 'other' national drink owing to its large market share in Scotland outselling major international brands such as Coca-Cola.

Philosophy
Scotland has a strong philosophical tradition. Duns Scotus was one of the premier medieval scholastics. In the Scottish Enlightenment Edinburgh was home to much intellectual talent, including Francis Hutcheson, David Hume, and Adam Smith. Other cities also produced major thinkers at that time: e.g. Aberdeen's Thomas Reid.

Folklore

Halloween, on the night of October 31, is a traditional and much celebrated holiday in Scotland. The name Halloween was first attested in the 16th century as a Scottish shortening of All-Hallows-Eve, and according to some historians it has its roots in the Gaelic festival of Samhain, when the Gaels believed the border between this world and the otherworld became thin, and the dead would revisit the mortal world. In 1780, Dumfries poet John Mayne noted Halloween pranks: "What fearfu' pranks ensue!", as well as the supernatural associations of that night, "Bogies" (ghosts). The bard of Scotland Robert Burns' 1785 poem Halloween is recited by Scots at Halloween, and Burns was influenced by Mayne's composition. In Scotland, traditional Halloween customs include: Guising — children in costume going from door to door demanding food or coins — which became established practice by the late 19th century, turnips hollowed out and carved with faces to make lanterns, and parties with games such as apple bobbing. Further contemporary imagery of Halloween is derived from Gothic and horror literature (notably Shelley's Frankenstein and Stoker's Dracula), and classic horror films (such as Hammer Horrors). Mass transatlantic Irish and Scottish immigration in the 19th century popularized Halloween in North America.

Language and religion

Scotland also has its own unique family of languages and dialects, helping to foster a strong sense of "Scottish-ness". See Scots language and Scottish Gaelic language. An organisation called Iomairt Cholm Cille (Columba Project) has been set up to support Gaelic-speaking communities in both Scotland and Ireland and to promote links between them.

Scotland retains its own national church, separate from that of England. See Church of Scotland and Religion in the United Kingdom. There is also a large minority of Roman Catholics, around 16% of the population.

The patron saint of Scotland is Saint Andrew, and Saint Andrew's Day is celebrated in Scotland on 30 November. Saint (Queen) Margaret, Saint Columba and Saint Ninian have also historically enjoyed great popularity.

Interceltic festivals

As one of the Celtic nations, Scotland is represented at interceltic events at home and around the world. Scotland is host to two interceltic music festivals – the Scottish Arts Council funded Celtic Connections, Glasgow, and the Hebridean Celtic Festival, Stornoway – that were founded in the mid-1990s.

Scottish culture is also represented at interceltic festivals of music and culture worldwide. Among the most well known are Festival Interceltique de Lorient – held annually in Brittany since 1971 – the Pan Celtic Festival, Ireland, and the National Celtic Festival, Portarlington, Australia.

National symbols

See also
 Architecture of Scotland
 A Drunk Man Looks at the Thistle
 Bard's blessing
 Homecoming Scotland 2009
 Scots language
 Scottish cringe
 Scottish Gaelic language
 Scottish mythology
 Scottish national identity
 Scottish people
 Tartanry and List of tartans

References

External links
 Scotland Cultural Profile – Scottish national cultural portal created with funding from the Scottish Executive
 Scottish legal tender
 Iomairt Cholm Cille
 Distance learning postgraduate course in Scottish Culture and Heritage